Sayyid Rahatullah Rahat Zakheli  (born 1884) was a Pashto poet, author and publisher in Azakhel Bala, Nowshera, in what is today Pakistan.

Zakheli launched Afghan, the first Pashto weekly newspaper, in 1910. He wrote Mah Rukh, the first Pashto novel, in 1912 and "Kunda Jinai", the first Pashto short story, in 1917.

References

1884 births
Pashto-language poets
Year of death missing
19th-century poets